Obispo may refer to:

Geography

Spain
Aldea del Obispo, Spain
Carrascal del Obispo, Spain
La Aldea del Obispo, Spain
Losa del Obispo, Spain

United States
San Luis Obispo, California
San Luis Obispo County, California
Camp San Luis Obispo
Mission San Luis Obispo de Tolosa
San Luis Obispo County Regional Airport
Cerro San Luis Obispo
San Luis Obispo Creek

Venezuela
Obispos Municipality
Obispo Ramos de Lora Municipality

Elsewhere
Obispo Santistevan Province, Bolivia
San Juan del Obispo, Guatemala

People with the name
Armando Obispo, Dutch professional footballer
Pascal Obispo, French singer
Wirfin Obispo, Dominican professional baseball player

Other uses
Obispo "Bishop" Losa, a main character in the FX television series Mayans M.C.
San Luis Obispo Handicap, a horse race
Supreme Bishop (Obispo Maximo), title of the leader of the Philippine Independent Church

See also
Bishop